Gerhard Aspheim (27 September 1930 – 21 November 2009) was a Norwegian jazz trombonist.

Career 
Aspheim was a member of Norway's first trad jazz band 'Dixie Serenaders' from 1949 to 1952, of 'Big Chief Jazzband' from 1952 to 1978 and then initiated his own orchestra Aspheim Oldtimers in 1979. They appeared at several jazz festivals in Norway and Germany and toured extensively in Europe. The orchestra has seven album releases. He also ran and developed the family business 'Aspheim Flygel- og Pianosenter', which he acquired in 1954 and developed into one of Scandinavia's largest grand piano and piano companies.

Aspheim was the eldest and a natural leader type. People thought he was the "Big Chief", and he was the obvious chairman of "The Big Chief Jazz Club" in the basement of Majorstuhuset (1953–65). His lectures on jazz history, which often spanned to 1930, was legendary. He also promoted the annual 'Norwegian Championship for amateur jazz band' (1954–1964), the Journal "Jazz Society" (1957–59), "Kunstnerkroa" (1957–60) and the legendary "Metropol Jazz Center" in Akersgata (1960–65). In addition, he held several positions in the Norwegian Jazz Federation in the first five years after it was founded (1953). He received an honorary award at the 2004 Oslo Jazzfestival.

Aspheim inherited the family business "Aspheim’s Flygel og Pianosenter" in 1954. After finishing his education at Schimmel Pianofortefabrik, Braunschweig, West Germany, in 1957, he developed the company through 1960-80'es to become one of the largest piano firms in Scandinavia. Especially the close ties to the Schimmel family in Braunschweig was important for this process. Aspheim worked at the firm until he died in 2009.

Honors 
2004: Ella-prisen honorary award

Discography 

Aspheim Oldtimer's
1988: Oldtimers
1994: Waiting for the Day
1997: 18 Jazz Greens Med Aspheim Oldtimers
2000: Glemmer Du
2003: Passport to the Paradise
2004: Aspheim Oldtimers
2007: I'll See You in My Dreams

References

External links 

Gerhard Aspheim – den siste entusiast by Bjørn Stendahl on NRK Jazz (in Norwegian)

1930 births
2009 deaths
20th-century Norwegian trombonists
21st-century Norwegian trombonists
Norwegian jazz trombonists
Male trombonists
20th-century Norwegian male musicians
21st-century Norwegian male musicians
Male jazz musicians